The Global Internet Freedom Consortium is a consortium of organizations that develop and deploy anti-censorship technologies for use by Internet users in countries whose governments restrict Web-based information access.  The organization was reportedly begun in 2001 by Chinese-born scientists living in the United States reacting against Chinese government oppression of the Falun Gong.

Products
The main products are Freegate and Ultrasurf.

Funding
The organization states that the majority of its funding comes from its members.  In May 2010, the group was offered a $1.5 million (USD) grant from the United States Department of State. This move received criticism from representatives of the Chinese government.

See also 

Human rights in the People's Republic of China
Internet censorship
Internet censorship in the People's Republic of China
Political repression of cyber-dissidents

References

External links
Global Internet Freedom Consortium

Information technology organizations
Organizations established in 2001
Computer security organizations
Internet censorship